Moḥammad Abū Bakr Ṣiddīque al-Qurayshī (15 April 1865 – 17 March 1943) was a Bengali Islamic scholar and the inaugural Pir of Furfura Sharif in West Bengal. He is regarded by his followers, who are scattered across eastern India and Bangladesh, as a mujaddid (reviver) of Islam in the region, due to his significant contributions in religious propagation via the establishment of mosques and madrasas, publication of newspapers and education development in neglected areas. He was the founding president of the sociopolitical Anjuman-i-Wazin-i-Bangla organisation, which advocated for causes such as the Khilafat Movement and Pakistan Movement. Siddique died in 1943, and his shrine is greatly venerated as one of West Bengal's most prominent Sufi centres.

Early life and family 
Mohammad Abu Bakr Siddique was born on 15 April 1845, to a Bengali Muslim family in the village of Furfura, located in Hooghly district. His father, Haji Abdul Muqtadir Siddiqui, was a mawlana. The family was believed to have been descendants of Abu Bakr, the first Caliph of Islam and a member of the Banu Taym clan, part of the Arab tribe of Quraysh. Their ancestor, Mansur Baghdadi, left Baghdad in the Abbasid Caliphate in 741 AH (1340 CE) and settled in a village now known as Mollapara in Hooghly district, in the erstwhile Sultanate of Bengal. Mansur's descendant, Haji Mustafa Madani, pledged bay'ah along with Emperor Aurangzeb to Masum Sirhindi, the third son of Ahmad Sirhindi. Some letters of correspondence between Madani and Sirhindi are preserved in the Maktubat-e-Masumia in Rauza Sharif, Sirhind, and were published by Abdul Halim Arambagi in his biography of Mohammad Abu Bakr Siddique. In 1667, Emperor Aurangzeb gifted Madani tax-free land and an estate which included a mosque, and the area was named after him as Madanipur (Midnapore).

Siddique's father died when he was nine months old, and so he was raised by his mother, Mohabbat-un-Nesa Begum.

Education
His childhood education started at home around 1850. After learning basic Islamic knowledge, he enrolled in a local primary school and intended to begin teaching non-islamic subjects including English. One night as a child, he dreamed that the Prophet of Islam, Muhammad, was advising him to abandon this teaching. He then left this education and joined Sitapur Madrassah, an ancient educational institution (established in 1772) near Furfura. After completing his primary education here, he took first place in the then highest Jamaat-e-Ula class from Mohsinia Madrasa in Hooghly city. 

Then went to Calcutta city and enrolled in Jamaluddin Education Center in the then Sinduria Patti Masjid (now Kalutla, Kolkata). There, Hafez studied Hadith, Tafsir and Fiqh under Jamaluddin Mungeri. Hafez Jamal Uddin was the caliph of Syed Ahmad Barelvi. He then studied Hikmah and philosophy under Nazar Shah Belayati from Firangi Mahal. He stayed at the Nakhoda Mosque while studying with Belayati.

After completing his formal education, he researched various aspects of Islam for 18 years. During this time he established his own library, where there were many rare books. The library is currently attached to the Furfura title madrasa he founded. In 1892 he traveled to Mecca and Medina. During his stay in Medina, he obtained the certificate of 40 Hadith books from the Muhaddith Syed Mohammad Amin Ibn Ahmad.

Contribution to education
He established 1100 madrassahs and 700 mosques. The Madrassahs he established in his village became one of India's leading educational institutions, and even Haji Shariatullah, the founder of the Faraizi movement in East Bengal, came to this village to learn Arabic and Persian. He was a member of the managing committee of Calcutta Alia Madrassah in 1928.

Hadith studies 
M. Obaidul (1903-1984), principal of Feni Alia Madrassah in Bangladesh, said about him,

During his lifetime there was no teaching of Hadith in Alia Madrassah. He introduced this system, the practice of this system started in 1902 by teaching hadith in Kolkata Ghaspatti Mosque. Shamsul Ulama Shah Safiullah was appointed to this mosque to teach hadith on a salary of 20 rupees. He himself used to teach hadith in this mosque.

He acquired special erudition on hadith scriptures, his nephew Abu Jafar Siddique obtained the certificate of 20 hadith books from him. Maulana Mansoor Hussain, one of his relatives of Furfura village, received from him the recitation and attestation of the hadith book Musnad Abu Hanifa. Also many scholars learned hadith from him.

Spiritual experience
Abu Bakr Siddique imbibed two methods of attaining nearness to Allah namely jizba and suluk. Much is said about his spiritual state during his student days at the Hooghly Madrassah, a four-way connection with his heart most nights. When this connection was associated with the Tariqa, he would eagerly chant that Tariqa. Also many times his apada-masat would be covered by a light and his self-forgetfulness would occur.

He was a khalifah of Karamat Ali Jaunpuri.

Influence 
At the end of the 19th century, when the intensity of the Faraizi and Tariqa-e-Muhammadiyah movements subsided, the Muslims were also somewhat weak. There were many divisions among the Muslims, Abu Bakr was worried when the Muslims adopted different religions in different places. He was determined to work for the unity of the Ummah, and tried to eliminate shirk, Bid'ah, superstition etc. from the two Bengals. Among the scholars who helped him in this work were Shamsul Ulama Ghulam Salmani (1854 – 1912), Allama Lutfur Rahman Burdwani (d. 1920), Allama Ishaq Burdwani (d. 1928), Belayat Hussain Birbhumi (1887), Abdul Wahid Chatgami (d. 1910), Muhammad Mangalkoti Burdwani (d. 1907) is notable. Abdul Awwal Jaunpuri and Karamat Ali Jaunpuri also helped in spreading various ahadith. Both of them were influential writers.

References

Citations

Bibliography 
 
 
 

Islam in West Bengal
1845 births
1939 deaths
19th-century Bengalis
Bengali educators
18th-century Indian educators
Indian social workers
18th-century Indian scholars
People from Hooghly district
People from British India
19th-century Indian Muslims
20th-century Indian Muslims
Bengali Sufi saints
20th-century Bengalis
Bengali Muslim scholars of Islam
Scholars from West Bengal
Indian scholars of Islam